Showgirl's Luck is a 1931 Australian musical directed by Norman Dawn. It was the first Australian full talking film.

Synopsis
Peggy Morton (Susan Denis) works as the star of a touring tent show in rural Queensland when she is offered the lead in the first Australian talking film, being made in the Blue Mountains. A rival, Mona Blake (Sadie Bedford) tells her that the offer has been withdrawn and takes the job instead. Peggy's show closes and she finds a job by posing as a Swedish maid. She winds up employed at the same hotel being used by the film company and discovers Mona's deception. Mona's husband abducts Peggy but an actor, Barry (Arthur Clarke) rescues her. Peggy ends up getting cast in the film.

Cast
Susan Denis as Peggy Morton
Arthur Tauchert as Hap
Arthur Clarke as Barry
Fred Bluett as Hollis
Sadie Bedford as Mona
Paul Longuet as Dud
George Saunders as Uncle George
Peggy Pryde
George Lloyd
Les Coney
Des Tooley
the Loretto Brothers

Production
The film was directed by Norman Dawn, who had previously made two films in Australia. He returned to Sydney in October 1929 with plans to make a sound movie using a sound-on-disc recording system. He announced he would go into partnership with J. C. Williamson Ltd but this does not seem to have eventuated. The formed a company, Australian Talkies. One of his investors was radio announcer, "Uncle George" Saunders. An original title of the film was Talkie Mad.

Shooting started in May 1930 and took place at the Lapstone Hill Hotel in the Blue Mountains and at the Sydney Showground. The female lead, Susan Denis, was Dawn's wife. Dawn liked to use sophisticated optical effects such as exposures and matts.

Release
By the time the film was read for trade screening in January 1931, the sound-on-disc system was out of date and Dawn tried to transfer the sound to an optical track. It did not premiere until December 1931, after which it only ran a week in Australian cinemas. Although the film managed to be released in the UK, commercial and critical reception was poor and Dawn made no further films in Australia.

Uncle George Saunders later declared bankruptcy and complained about Dawn:
The directors [of Australian Talkies] borrowed £1,400. Norman Dawn and his
wife were brought from the United States to produce a picture, and then Dawn disappeared. They learnt he had gone back to America. He had trouble with his wife and left us high and dry with the picture. The person who lent us the money took possession. The directors lost everything.

References

External links
Showgirl's Luck in the Internet Movie Database
Showgirl's Luck at National Film and Sound Archive
Showgirl's Luck at Oz Movies

1931 films
Lost Australian films
Australian musical comedy films
1931 musical films
Films directed by Norman Dawn
Australian black-and-white films
1931 lost films